Sabinia may refer to:

Geology 
 Sabinia microcontinent, a fragment of continental crust that underlies the Sabine Uplift, Texas and Louisiana

Paleontology 
 Sabinia (bivalve), a genus of rudist bivalves in the superfamily Hippuritacea

Surname 
 The Sabinia gens, a minor plebeian family at ancient Rome

See also 
 Sabina (disambiguation)
 Santa Sabina (disambiguation)
 Sabine (disambiguation)
 Sabrina (disambiguation)